Pavitra Bandham ( The Holy Bond) is a 1996 Indian Telugu-language romantic drama film co-written and directed by Muthyala Subbaiah. It stars Venkatesh and Soundarya, with music composed by M. M. Keeravani. The film was produced by C. Venkataraju and G. Sivaraju under the Geeta Chitra International banner. The film was declared a blockbuster at the box office.

The film won three Nandi Awards. Owing to its success, it was remade in six other languages -  in Odia as Suhaag Sindura (1996), in Kannada as Mangalyam Tantunanena (1998), in Hindi as Hum Aapke Dil Mein Rehte Hain (1999), in Tamil as Priyamaanavale (2000), in Bengali as Saat Paake Bandha (2009), and also in Bangladeshi as E Badhon Jabena Chhire (2000).

Plot
Vishwanath (S. P. Balasubrahmanyam) is a multimillionaire industrialist. Vijay (Venkatesh), his only son, having grown up in the United States (Chicago, Illinois), has no interest in marriage; his goal is to enjoy his youth as much as possible. Vishwanath would like his son to get married and become responsible; his insistence makes Vijay agree to a marriage, but with a unique condition — a kind of test drive. The marriage will be for a single year, initially, and at the end of the year he can choose to continue it, or not, depending on his attitude towards his wife, in that duration, the marriage will be annulled. Radha (Soundarya), Vishwanath's personal secretary, is a hardworking young woman struggling to support her family. Vishwanath asks Radha to quit her job and marry his son, but she refuses when she hears Vijay's strange condition. However, Radha's family is in dire financial straits, and so she has to reconsider this offer. In return for marrying Vijay, she asks for financial support for her family, which Vishwanath readily provides.

Vijay and Radha are married. After the marriage, they become friendly with each other, and Radha goes out of her way to look after Vijay when he meets with an accident. At the end of the year, however, Vijay decides to annul the marriage, as had been agreed upon. Radha leaves Vijay and returns home. After the separation, Vijay starts to feel a longing for the presence of his devoted wife. Soon, though, he realizes her worth and wants her to come back, but she declines. Meanwhile, Radha finds out that she is pregnant. In order to support herself, she gets a job in a new company; to her surprise, when the company's managing director arrives, he turns out to be Vijay. He later confesses to her that he's a changed person and wants her back. But even after repeated persuasion, she disagrees because her faith in him has been shattered. Vijay continues to pursue her and leaves no stone unturned to show her that he cares for her. Later, Radha and her family hold a ceremony for the well-being of her to-be-born child. Vishwanath and Vijay attend the ceremony as well, Radha reveals Vijay to be her husband and tells all the guests about the marriage-contract. An argument follows; Vijay and his father walk out, followed by all the guests.

Near the completion of her pregnancy, Radha learns that troublemakers Dileep (Prakash Raj) and Jayaram (Srihari), who had once attempted to kill Vijay, have escaped from prison. They are out looking for Vijay, who had fired them from his father's company for cheating and fraud. Radha gets anxious and tries to reach Vijay as soon as possible. On the way, she learns that the whole thing was a set-up by Vijay's friends to lure her back to her husband. But Dilip and Jayaram have attacked Vijay in reality and brutally stabbed him. Enraged, Radha goes to confront Vijay and as soon as she meets him, she accuses him of this shameless act. As she turns to leave, he staggers, and in a cry of pain, takes out the broken glass that Jayaram stabbed him with from the stomach. Radha, upon seeing his wound runs towards him, slips, and goes into labor. Vijay, summoning up all his strength, takes Radha to the hospital. On the way, Dileep and Jayaram attempt to kill them, but fail and die in a truck accident. While in the hospital, Vijay is treated for his injuries and Radha delivers a healthy baby boy. After the recovery, they are reconciled.

Cast

 Venkatesh as Vijay
 Soundarya as Radha
 S. P. Balasubrahmanyam as Viswanath, Vijay's father
 Prakash Raj as Dileep
 Srihari as Jayaram
 Brahmanandam as Brahmam, Vijay's driver
 Sudhakar as Prasad, Vijay's friend
 Subhalekha Sudhakar as Shankar, Radha's brother
 Annapoorna as Radha's mother
 Syelaja as Radha's sister
 Posani Krishna Murali as Radha's brother-in-law
 Suthi Velu as Ramaiyah, Vijay's house help 
 Ragini as Padmini "Paddu", Brahmam's wife
 Juttu Narasimham as Brahmam's father-in-law, Paddu's father
 Kallu Chidambaram as Beggar
 Jenny
 Sherri as Anitha, Dileep's sister; Vijay's one-sided lover
 Annuja as Lalitha "Lalli", Prasad's wife; Paddu's sister
 Vani as Seeta, Radha's younger sister
 Kishore Rathi
 Ooma Sharma

Soundtrack

Music was composed by M. M. Keeravani. Music was released on T-Series Audio Company.

Remakes

Reception 
A critic from Andhra Today opined that "The movie 'Pavithra Bandham' has a good message for the present day youth obsessed by the western culture. The movie sends across a clear message that marriage is a unique relationship".

Awards
Nandi Awards - 1996
 Best Feature Film - Gold - C. Venkata Raju
 Best Actress - Soundarya
 Best Supporting Actor - S. P. Balasubrahmanyam

References

External links
 

1996 films
1990s Telugu-language films
Telugu films remade in other languages
Films scored by M. M. Keeravani
1996 romantic drama films
Indian romantic drama films
Films directed by Muthyala Subbaiah